"Star Train" is a single by Japanese trio Perfume, released in Japan on October 28, 2015. It is the fourth single from their fifth studio album Cosmic Explorer. 

"Star Train" was used as the title track of Perfume's own documentary, titled WE ARE Perfume -WORLD TOUR 3rd DOCUMENT, released in both Japan and the US on October 31, 2015.

Background
Star Train was released to celebrate their 15 anniversary since their formation. The single was released in 2 separate discs, a CD+DVD Limited Edition and a regular version CD. One of the B-side of the single, "Imitation World" was only included in the limited version. A music video of the song was included in the DVD.

Track listings

Certifications

References

2015 songs
Perfume (Japanese band) songs
2015 singles
Japanese-language songs
Song recordings produced by Yasutaka Nakata
Songs written by Yasutaka Nakata
Universal J singles